A Petal is a 1996 South Korean film directed by Jang Sun-woo.

Plot
The film tells the story of a girl who experienced the Gwangju Uprising at the age of 15, and its effect on her life in later years.

Cast
 Lee Jung-hyun as Girl
 Moon Sung-keun as Jang
 Sol Kyung-gu
 Chu Sang-mi
 Park Chul-min
 Park Kwang-jung
 Lee Young-ran as Girl's Mother

Production
This film was a difficult job for 15-years old Lee Jung-hyun, who did not know acting. Director Sun-Woo Jang was furious on the first day of shooting. "At first I wasn't good at acting, so the director threw away the script and stopped shooting. I took it myself and I cried for a long time in the dormitory. Then I woke up. 'Then I have to live like a crazy child,' I thought. Because if I can't act, I simply have no choice but to become that kind of person." So she began wandering around the neighborhood for three or four hours before the shoots. People in the neighborhood thought she was a really crazy child and took her home to wash and feed her. "There was no line between everyday life and acting. It was an ignorant approach. (laughs). The director and Sol Kyung-gu looked at me that way and said, 'Tomorrow is the last shoot, but what if she goes crazy even after she's done?'"

Awards
 Asia Pacific Film Festival (1997) Best Film
 Asia Pacific Film Festival (1996) Best Film
 Bangkok International Film Festival (1998) Jury Award Best Feature Film - Asian Cinema
 Mannheim-Heidelberg International Filmfestival (1996) Prize of the Ecumenical Jury and Special Mention (Jang Sun-woo)
 Rotterdam International Film Festival (1997) KNF Award - Special Mention (Jang Sun-woo)
 Blue Dragon Film Awards (1996) Best Actor (Moon Sung-keun)
 Blue Dragon Film Awards (1996) Best New Actress (Lee Jung-hyun)
 Grand Bell Awards (1996) Best New Actress (Lee Jung-hyun)
 Korean Association of Film Critics Awards (1996) Best New Actress (Lee Jung-hyun)
 Cine 21 Film Awards (1997) Best New Actress (Lee Jung-hyun)

Notes

Bibliography
 
 
 

1996 films
1990s Korean-language films
South Korean historical drama films
Films about the Gwangju Uprising
Films directed by Jang Sun-woo